The 2014 Delaware State Hornets football team represented Delaware State University in the 2014 NCAA Division I FCS football season. They were led by fourth-year head coach Kermit Blount and played their home games at Alumni Stadium. They were a member of the Mid-Eastern Athletic Conference (MEAC). They finished the season 2–10, 2–6 in MEAC play to finish in a tie for ninth place.

On December 16, Delaware State decided to not renew Blount's contract. He finished at Delaware State with a four-year record of 16–29.

Schedule
*Source: Schedule

References

Delaware State
Delaware State Hornets football seasons
Delaware State Hornets football